KRUT may refer to:

 Rutland – Southern Vermont Regional Airport (ICAO code KRUT)
 KRUT-LP, a low-power radio station (94.9 FM) licensed to serve Houston, Texas, United States